The Serbian Army of Krajina was the armed forces of the Republic of Serbian Krajina (RSK). Also known as the Army of the Republic of Serbian Krajina or Krajina Serbian Army, the armed forces of Krajina consisted of ground and air elements.

Created through the merger of the Territorial Defense of the Republika Srpska Krajina (TORSK), units of the Yugoslav People's Army (JNA) and the Krajina Militia, the Krajina Serb Army was officially established on 19 March 1992. Responsible for the security of the RSK, its area of responsibility covered an area of some 17,028 km² at its peak, as it was located entirely inland it thus had no naval forces. The Serbian Army of Krajina, along with the state of RSK, ceased to exist in 1995 following the Croatian military offensive Operation Storm.

Organization

Commanders-in-Chief

Commanders

Structure

 105th Aviation Brigade
 44th Air defense rocket brigade
 75th Mixed artillery brigade
 "Pauk" Operational Group
 Special forces corps
 7th Dalmatia (dalmatinski) corps
 15th Lika (lički) corps
 21st Kordun (kordunski) corps
 39th Banija (banijski) corps
 18th West-Slavonia (zapadnoslavonski) corps
 11th East-Slavonia (istočnoslavonski) corps

At the creation of the army, it was planned that its number would be 80,000 people, however it turned out to be less.
 According to Colonel Kosta Novaković: 62,483 (772 officers, 2,709 non-commissioned officers and 59,002 soldiers) or 78% of the planned number.
 According to the General Staff in 1994: 62,805 (2,890 officers, 4,329 non-commissioned officers and 55,886 soldiers).
 According to General Milisav Sekulić: 71,409 (3,291 officers, 3,424 non-commissioned officers and 60,496 soldiers).

Equipment
 Armored Vehicles
 T-34/85
 T-55
 T-72  (2)
 M-84 (31)
 PT-76
 OT M-60
 BVP M-80
 BOV (APC)
 BRDM-2
 SU-100
 M36 Jackson
 M18 Hellcat
 Artillery
 M-63 Plamen
 M-77 Oganj (11)
 9K52 Luna-M
 Anti-aircraft 
 ZSU-57-2
 M53/59 Praga
 9K35 Strela 1
 Strela 2
 9K38 Igla
 S-75 Dvina
 2K12 Kub
 Aircraft
 An-2 (1)
 J-20 Kraguj
 Soko J-22 Orao (2)
 J-21 Jastreb (12)
 G-2 Galeb
 Aérospatiale Gazelle
 Mil Mi-8T
 Utva 66
 Zlin Z-526
 Other
 Krajina Express
 K-15 Krajina Missile

Gallery

War crimes 

During the Croatian War of Independence, numerous massacres were conducted by the Army of Serbian Krajina. One of the most notable attacks was the Zagreb rocket attacks, which was launched in retaliation for Operation Flash. 7 Croats were killed and 214 wounded.

See also 
Army of Republika Srpska

References

Sources

External links
 

Military of Serbian Krajina